A BRCA mutation is a mutation in either of the BRCA1 and BRCA2 genes, which are tumour suppressor genes. Hundreds of different types of mutations in these genes have been identified, some of which have been determined to be harmful, while others have no proven impact. Harmful mutations in these genes may produce a hereditary breast–ovarian cancer syndrome in affected persons. Only 5–10% of breast cancer cases in women are attributed to BRCA1 and BRCA2 mutations (with BRCA1 mutations being slightly more common than BRCA2 mutations), but the impact on women with the gene mutation is more profound. Women with harmful mutations in either BRCA1 or BRCA2 have a risk of breast cancer that is about five times the normal risk, and a risk of ovarian cancer that is about ten to thirty times normal. The risk of breast and ovarian cancer is higher for women with a high-risk BRCA1 mutation than with a BRCA2 mutation. Having a high-risk mutation does not guarantee that the woman will develop any type of cancer, or imply that any cancer that appears was actually caused by the mutation, rather than some other factor.

High-risk mutations, which disable an important error-free DNA repair process (homology directed repair), significantly increase the person's risk of developing breast cancer, ovarian cancer and certain other cancers. Why BRCA1 and BRCA2 mutations lead preferentially to cancers of the breast and ovary is not known, but lack of BRCA1 function seems to lead to non-functional X-chromosome inactivation. Not all mutations are high-risk; some appear to be harmless variations.  The cancer risk associated with any given mutation varies significantly and depends on the exact type and location of the mutation and possibly other individual factors.

Mutations can be inherited from either parent and may be passed on to both sons and daughters.  Each child of a genetic carrier, regardless of sex, has a 50% chance of inheriting the mutated gene from the parent who carries the mutation. As a result, half of the people with BRCA gene mutations are male, who would then pass the mutation on to 50% of their offspring, male or female.  The risk of BRCA-related breast cancers for men with the mutation is higher than for other men, but still low. However, BRCA mutations can increase the risk of other cancers, such as colon cancer, pancreatic cancer, and prostate cancer.

Methods to diagnose the likelihood of a patient with mutations in BRCA1 and BRCA2 getting cancer were covered by patents owned or controlled by Myriad Genetics. Myriad's business model of exclusively offering the diagnostic test led to Myriad growing from being a startup in 1994 to being a publicly traded company with 1200 employees and about $500M in annual revenue in 2012; it also led to controversy over high prices and the inability to get second opinions from other diagnostic labs, which in turn led to the landmark Association for Molecular Pathology v. Myriad Genetics lawsuit.

Biallelic and homozygous inheritance of a BRCA gene leads to a severe form of Fanconi anemia, and is embryonically lethal in the majority of the cases.

Health effects

Women with deleterious mutations in either the BRCA1 or BRCA2 genes have a high risk of developing breast and/or ovarian cancer.  Because different studies look at different populations, and because different types of mutations have somewhat different risks, the risk is best expressed as a range, rather than a single number.

Approximately 50% to 65% of women born with a deleterious mutation in BRCA1 will develop breast cancer by age 70, and 35% to 46% will develop ovarian cancer by age 70.  Approximately 40% to 57% of women with a deleterious mutation in BRCA2 will develop breast cancer by age 70, and 13% to 23% will develop ovarian cancer by age 70.

Women with a breast cancer associated with a BRCA mutation have up to a 40% probability of developing a new primary breast cancer within 10 years following initial diagnosis if they did not receive tamoxifen treatment or have an oophorectomy. The woman's ten-year risk for ovarian cancer is also increased by 6-12% under these conditions.

Statistics for BRCA-related ovarian cancer typically encompass not only cancer of the ovaries themselves, but also peritoneal cancer and the very rare, but somewhat easier to detect, cancer of the Fallopian tubes.  Women with a BRCA mutation have more than 100 times the normal rate of Fallopian tube cancer.  These three types of these cancers can be difficult to distinguish in their advanced stages.

Cancer onset
BRCA-related breast cancer appears at an earlier age than sporadic breast cancer.  It has been asserted that BRCA-related breast cancer is more aggressive than normal breast cancer, however most studies in specific populations suggest little or no difference in survival rates despite seemingly worse prognostic factors.
 BRCA1 is associated with triple-negative breast cancer, which does not respond to hormonal treatments and cannot be usefully treated with some drugs, such as trastuzumab. Breast cancer often appears about two decades earlier than normal.
 BRCA2 is associated primarily with post-menopausal breast cancer, although the risk of pre-menopausal breast cancer is significant.  It is typically highly responsive to hormonal treatments.

BRCA-related ovarian and Fallopian tube cancer is more treatable than average because it is unusually susceptible to platinum-based chemotherapy like cisplatin.  BRCA1-related ovarian cancer appears at younger ages, but the risk for women with BRCA2 climbs markedly at or shortly after menopause.

Survival impact

A 25-year-old woman with no mutation in her BRCA genes has an 84% probability to reach at least the age of 70. Of those not surviving, 11% die from either breast or ovarian cancer, and 89% from other causes.

Compared to that, a woman with a high-risk BRCA1 mutation, if she had breast cancer screening but no prophylactic medical or surgical intervention, would have only 59% chance to reach age 70, twenty-five percentage points lower than normal. Of those women not surviving, 26% would die of breast cancer, 46% ovarian cancer, and 28% other causes.

Women with high-risk BRCA2 mutations, with screening but with no prophylactic medical or surgical intervention, would have only 71% chance to reach age 70, thirteen percentage points lower than normal. Of those not surviving, 21% would die of breast cancer, 25% ovarian cancer and 54% other causes.

The likelihood of surviving to at least age 70 can be improved by several medical interventions, notably prophylactic mastectomy and oophorectomy.

Male breast cancer
Men with a BRCA mutation have a dramatically elevated relative risk of developing breast cancer, but because the overall incidence of breast cancer in men is so low, the absolute risk is equal to or lower than the risk for women without a BRCA mutation.  Approximately 1% to 2% of men with a BRCA1 mutation will develop breast cancer by age 70.  Approximately 6% of men with a BRCA2 mutation will develop breast cancer by age 70, which is approximately equal to the risk for women without a BRCA mutation.  Very few men, with or without a predisposing mutation, develop breast cancer before age 50.

Approximately half of men who develop breast cancer have a mutation in a BRCA gene or in one of the other genes associated with hereditary breast–ovarian cancer syndromes.

Breast cancer in men can be treated as successfully as breast cancer in women, but men often ignore the signs and symptoms of cancer, such as a painful area or an unusual swelling, which may be no bigger than a grain of rice, until it has reached a late stage.

Unlike other men, men with a BRCA mutation, especially a BRCA2 mutation, may benefit from professional and self breast exams.  Medical imaging is not usually recommended, but because male BRCA2 carriers have a risk of breast cancer that is very similar to the general female population, the standard annual mammogram program can be adapted to these high-risk men.

Other cancers
Mutations have been associated with increased risk of developing any kind of invasive cancer, including stomach cancer, pancreatic cancer, prostate cancer, and colon cancer. Carriers have the normal risks of developing cancer (and other diseases) associated with increased age, smoking, alcohol consumption, poor diet, lack of exercise, and other known risk factors, plus the additional risk from the genetic mutations and an increased susceptibility to damage from ionizing radiation, including natural background radiation.

Men with BRCA mutations cannot get ovarian cancer, but they may be twice as likely as non-carriers to develop prostate cancer at a younger age.   The risk is smaller and disputed for BRCA1 carriers; up to one-third of BRCA2 mutation carriers are expected to develop prostate cancer before age 65.  Prostate cancer in BRCA mutation carriers tends to appear a decade earlier than normal, and it tends to be more aggressive than normal.  As a result, annual prostate screening, including a digital rectal examination, is appropriate at age 40 among known carriers, rather than age 50.

Cancer of the pancreas tends to run in families, even among BRCA families.   A BRCA1 mutation approximately doubles or triples the lifetime risk of developing pancreatic cancer; a BRCA2 mutation triples to quintuples it.  Between 4% and 7% of people with pancreatic cancer have a BRCA mutation. However, since pancreatic cancer is relatively rare, people with a BRCA2 mutation probably face an absolute risk of about 5%.  Like ovarian cancer, it tends not to produce symptoms in the early, treatable stages.  Like prostate cancer, pancreatic cancer associated with a BRCA mutation tends to appear about a decade earlier than non-hereditary cases. Asymptomatic screening is invasive and may be recommended only to BRCA2 carriers who also have a family history of pancreatic cancer.

Melanoma is the most deadly skin cancer, although it is easily cured in the early stages.  The normal likelihood of developing melanoma depends on race, the number of moles the person has, family history, age, sex, and how much the person has been exposed to UV radiation. BRCA2 mutation carriers have approximately double or triple the risk that they would normally have, including a higher than average risk of melanoma of the eye.

Cancer of the colon is approximately as common in both men and women in the developed world as breast cancer is among average-risk women, with about 6% of people being diagnosed with it, usually over the age of 50.   Like sporadic prostate cancer, it is a multifactorial disease, and is affected by age, diet, and similar factors.  BRCA mutation carriers have a higher than average risk of this common cancer, but the risk is not as high as in some other hereditary cancers.  The risk might be as high as four times normal in some BRCA1 families, and double the normal risk among BRCA2 carriers.  Like pancreatic cancer, it may be that only some BRCA mutations or some BRCA families have the extra risk; unlike other BRCA-caused cancers, it does not appear at an earlier age than usual.   Normal colon cancer screening is usually recommended to BRCA mutation carriers.

Mutations in BRCA1 and BRCA2 are strongly implicated in some hematological malignancies.  BRCA1 mutations are associated acute myelogenous leukemia and chronic myelogenous leukemia. Mutations of BRCA2 are also found in many T-cell lymphomas and chronic lymphocytic leukemias.

Childbearing
The dilemma of whether or not to have children may be a source of stress for women who learn of their BRCA mutations during their childbearing years.

There is likely little or no effect of a BRCA gene mutation on overall fertility, although women with a BRCA mutation may be more likely to have primary ovarian insufficiency.
 BRCA mutation carriers may be more likely to give birth to girls than boys, however this observation has been attributed to ascertainment bias.

If both parents are carriers of a BRCA mutation, then pre-implantation genetic diagnosis is sometimes used to prevent the birth of a child with BRCA mutations.  Inheriting two BRCA1 mutations (one from each parent) has never been reported and is believed to be a lethal birth defect.  Inheriting one BRCA1 mutation and one BRCA2 mutation has been reported occasionally; the child's risk for any given type of cancer is the higher risk of the two genes (e.g., the ovarian cancer risk from BRCA1 and the pancreatic cancer risk from BRCA2).  Inheriting two BRCA2 mutations produces Fanconi anemia.

Each pregnancy in genetically typical women is associated with a significant reduction in the mother's risk of developing breast cancer after age 40. The younger the woman is at the time of her first birth, the more protection against breast cancer she receives.  Breastfeeding for more than one year protects against breast cancer.  Pregnancy also protects against ovarian cancer in genetically typical women.

Although some studies have produced different results, women with BRCA mutations are generally not expected to receive these significant protective benefits. Current research is too limited and imprecise to permit calculation of specific risks. However, the following general trends have been identified:
 For women with a BRCA1 mutation, the woman's age when she first gives birth has no association with her risk of breast cancer. Childbearing provides no protection against breast cancer, unless the woman has five or more full-term pregnancies, at which point she receives only modest protection. Similar to genetically typical women, pregnancy protects against ovarian cancer in BRCA1 women. Breastfeeding for more than one year significantly protects against breast cancer. This effect may be as high as 19% per year of breastfeeding, which is much higher than that seen among genetically typical women. The effect, if any, of long-term breastfeeding on ovarian cancer is unclear.
 For women with a BRCA2 mutation, each pregnancy is paradoxically associated with a statistically significant increase in the risk for breast cancer. Unlike genetically typical women or women with BRCA1 mutations, breastfeeding has no effect on either cancer in women with BRCA2 mutations. Limited and conflicting data suggest that, also unlike other women, pregnancy does not reduce ovarian cancer risk significantly in women with a BRCA2 mutation and might increase it.

Biallelic and homozygous inheritance
Reports of patients biallelic or homozygous for a deleterious BRCA allele conferring a greatly increased risk of breast cancer are rare. This is because deleterious BRCA alleles are lethal alleles; this condition is embryonically lethal in the majority of the cases.  For live cases, inheriting both mutations lead to a grave prognosis, characterized by Wilms tumors, leukemias, and early-onset brain malignancies.

Genetics

Both BRCA genes are tumor suppressor genes that produce proteins that are used by the cell in an enzymatic pathway that makes very precise, perfectly matched repairs to DNA molecules that have double-stranded breaks. The pathway requires proteins produced by several other genes, including CHK2, FANCD2 and ATM. Harmful mutations in any of these genes disable the gene or the protein that it produces.

The cancer risk caused by BRCA1 and BRCA2 mutations are inherited in a dominant fashion even though usually only one mutated allele is directly inherited. This is because people with the mutation are likely to acquire a second mutation, leading to dominant expression of the cancer. A mutated BRCA gene can be inherited from either parent.  Because they are inherited from the parents, they are classified as  hereditary or germline mutations rather than acquired or somatic mutations.  Cancer caused by a mutated gene inherited from an individual's parents is a hereditary cancer rather than a sporadic cancer.

Because humans have a diploid genome, each cell has two copies of the gene (one from each biological parent).  Typically only one copy contains a disabling, inherited mutation, so the affected person is heterozygous for the mutation.  If the functional copy is harmed, however, then the cell is forced to use alternate DNA repair mechanisms, which are more error-prone.  The loss of the functional copy is called loss of heterozygosity (LOH). Any resulting errors in DNA repair may result in cell death or a cancerous transformation of the cell.

There are many variations in BRCA genes, and not all changes confer the same risks.

Some variants are harmless; others are known to be very harmful.  Some single nucleotide polymorphisms may confer only a small risk, or may only confer risk in the presence of other mutations or under certain circumstances.  In other cases, whether the variant is harmful is unknown.  Variants are classified as follows:
 Deleterious mutation:  The change is proven to cause significant risks.  Often, these are frameshift mutations that prevent the cell from producing more than the first part of the necessary protein.
 Suspected deleterious:  While nothing is proven, the variation is currently believed to be harmful.
 Variant of uncertain significance (VUS):  Whether the change has any effect is uncertain.  This is a common test result, and most variations began in this category.  As more evidence is acquired, these are re-classified.
 Variant, favor polymorphism:  While nothing is proven, the variation is currently believed to be harmless.
 Benign polymorphism:  The change is classified as harmless.  These may be reported as "no mutation".

Deleterious mutations have high, but not complete, genetic penetrance, which means that people with the mutation have a high risk of developing disease as a result, but that some people will not develop cancer despite carrying a harmful mutation.

Diagnosis
Genetic counseling is recommended in women whose personal or family health history suggests a greater than average likelihood of a mutation. The purpose of genetic counseling is to educate the person about the likelihood of a positive result, the risks and benefits of being tested, the limitations of the tests, the practical meaning of the results, and the risk-reducing actions that could be taken if the results are positive.  They are also trained to support people through any emotional reactions and to be a neutral person who helps the client make his or her own decision in an informed consent model, without pushing the client to do what the counselor might do.  Because the knowledge of a mutation can produce substantial anxiety, some people choose not to be tested or to postpone testing until a later date.

Relative indications for testing for a mutation in BRCA1 or BRCA2 for newly diagnosed or family members include a family history among 1st (FDR), 2nd (SDR), or 3rd(TDR) degree relatives usually on the same side of the family but not limited:
 A known mutation (BRCA1 or BRCA2) in a cancer susceptibility gene within the family
 Women affected by any breast cancer diagnosed under the age of 30
 Women affected by triple negative breast cancer (TNBC) (estrogen receptor negative, progesterone receptor negative, and HER2/neu negative) under the age of 50
 Two relatives (FDR/SDR) diagnosed under the age of 45
 Three relatives (FDR/SDR) diagnosed with average age of 50 or less
 Four relatives at any ages
 Ovarian cancer with either an additional diagnosed relative or a relative with male breast cancer
 A single family member with both breast and ovarian cancer
 Male breast cancer
 Pancreatic cancer with breast or ovarian cancer in the same individual or on the same side of the family
 Ashkenazi Jewish or Polish ancestry with one FDR family member affected by breast or ovarian cancer at any age

Testing young children is considered medically unethical because the test results would not change the way the child's health is cared for.

Test procedure
Two types of tests are available.  Both commonly use a blood sample, although testing can be done on saliva. The quickest, simplest, and lowest cost test uses positive test results from a blood relative and checks only for the single mutation that is known to be present in the family.  If no relative has previously disclosed positive test results, then a full test that checks the entire sequence of both BRCA1 and BRCA2 can be performed.  In some cases, because of the founder effect, Jewish ethnicity can be used to narrow the testing to quickly check for the three most common mutations seen among Ashkenazi Jews.

Testing is commonly covered by health insurance and public healthcare programs for people at high risk for having a mutation, and not covered for people at low risk. The purpose of limiting the testing to high-risk people is to increase the likelihood that the person will receive a meaningful, actionable result from the test, rather than identifying a variant of unknown significance (VUS). In Canada, people who demonstrate their high-risk status by meeting specified guidelines are referred initially to a specialized program for hereditary cancers, and, if they choose to be tested, the cost of the test is fully covered.  In the US in 2010, single-site testing had a retail cost of US$400 to $500, and full-length analysis cost about $3,000 per gene, and the costs were commonly covered by private health insurance for people deemed to be at high risk.

The test is ordered by a physician, usually an oncologist, and the results are always returned to the physician, rather than directly to the patient.  How quickly results are returned depends on the test—single-site analysis requires less lab time—and on the infrastructure in place.  In the US, test results are commonly returned within one to several weeks; in Canada, patients commonly wait for eight to ten months for test results.

Test interpretation
A positive test result for a known deleterious mutation is proof of a predisposition, although it does not guarantee that the person will develop any type of cancer.  A negative test result, if a specific mutation is known to be present in the family, shows that the person does not have a BRCA-related predisposition for cancer, although it does not guarantee that the person will not develop a non-hereditary case of cancer.  By itself, a negative test result does not mean that the patient has no hereditary predisposition for breast or ovarian cancer.  The family may have some other genetic predisposition for cancer, involving some other gene.

Cancer prevention
A variety of screening options and interventions are available to manage BRCA-related cancer risks.  Screenings are adjusted to individual and familial risk factors.

As these screening methods do not prevent cancer, but merely attempt to catch it early, numerous methods of prevention are sometimes practiced, with varying results.

Screening
An intensive cancer screening regimen is usually advised for women with deleterious or suspected deleterious BRCA mutations in order to detect new cancers as early as possible.  A typical recommendation includes frequent breast cancer screening as well as tests to detect ovarian cancer.

Breast imaging studies usually include a breast MRI (magnetic resonance imaging) once a year, beginning between ages 20 and 30, depending on the age at which any relatives were diagnosed with breast cancer. Mammograms are typically used only at advanced age as there is reason to believe that BRCA carriers are more susceptible to breast cancer induction by X-ray damage than general population.

Alternatives include breast ultrasonography, CT scans, PET scans, scintimammography, elastography, thermography, ductal lavage, and experimental screening protocols, some of which hope to identify biomarkers for breast cancer (molecules that appear in the blood when breast cancer begins).

Ovarian cancer screening usually involves ultrasonography of the pelvic region, typically twice a year.  Women may also use a blood test for CA-125 and clinical pelvic exams.  The blood test has relatively poor sensitivity and specificity for ovarian cancer.

In both breast and ovarian screening, areas of tissue that look suspicious are investigated with either more imaging, possibly using a different type of imaging or after a delay, or with biopsies of the suspicious areas.

Medication
Birth control pills are associated with substantially lower risk of ovarian cancer in women with BRCA mutations. A 2013 meta-analysis found that oral contraceptive use was associated with a 42% reduction of the relative risk of ovarian cancer, the association was similar for BRCA1 and BRCA2 mutations. Use of oral contraceptives was not significantly associated with breast cancer risk although a small increase of risk that did not reach statistical significance was observed. A 2011 meta-analysis found that OC use was associated with a 43% relative reduction in risk of ovarian cancer in women with BRCA mutations, while data on the risk of breast cancer in BRCA mutation carriers with oral contraceptive use were heterogeneous and results were inconsistent.

Selective estrogen receptor modulators, specifically tamoxifen, have been found to reduce breast cancer risk in women with BRCA mutations who do not have their breast removed.   It is effective as for primary prevention (preventing the first case of breast cancer) in women with BRCA2 mutations, but not BRCA1 mutations, and for secondary prevention (preventing a second, independent breast cancer) in both groups of women.  Taking tamoxifen for five years has been found to halve the breast cancer risk in women who have a high risk of breast cancer for any reason, but potentially serious adverse effects like cataracts, blood clots, and endometrial cancer, along with quality of life issues like hot flashes, result in some women discontinuing its use and some physicians limiting its use to women with atypical growths in the breasts.  Tamoxifen is contraindicated for women who are most likely to be harmed by the common complications.  Raloxifene (Evista), which has a reduced risk of side effects, is used as an alternative, but it has not been studied in BRCA mutation carriers specifically.  Tamoxifen use can be combined with oophorectomy for even greater reduction of breast cancer risk, particularly in women with BRCA2 mutations.

Aromatase inhibitors are medications that prevent estrogen production in the adrenal glands and adipose tissue.  They have fewer side effects than selective estrogen receptor modulators like tamoxifen, but do not work in premenopausal women, because they do not prevent the ovaries from producing estrogen.

Surgery
Several type of preventive surgeries are known to substantially reduce cancer risk for women with high-risk BRCA mutations. The surgeries may be used alone, in combination with each other, or in combination with non-surgical interventions to reduce the risk of breast and ovarian cancer. Note that surgeries such as mastectomy and oophorectomy do not eliminate the chance of breast cancer; cases have reportedly emerged despite these procedures.
 Tubal ligation is the least invasive of these surgeries and appears to reduce ovarian cancer risk for BRCA1 carriers by over 60%. Salpingectomy is another option which is more invasive than tubal ligation and may result in additional risk reduction.  Both of these can be performed anytime after childbearing is complete. Unlike other prophylactic surgeries, these two surgeries do not reduce the risk of breast cancer.
 Prophylactic (preventive) mastectomy is associated with small risks and a large drop in breast cancer risk.
 Prophylactic salpingo-oophorectomy (removal of the ovaries and Fallopian tubes) results in a very large reduction in ovarian cancer risk, and a large reduction in breast cancer risk if performed before natural menopause.  However, it also comes with the risk of substantial adverse effects if performed at a young age.
 Hysterectomy has no direct effect on BRCA-related cancers, but it enables the women to use some medications that reduce breast cancer risk (such as tamoxifen) with the risk of uterine cancer and to use fewer hormones to manage the adverse effects of a prophylactic oophorectomy.

Whether and when to perform which preventive surgeries is a complex personal decision. Current medical knowledge offers some guidance about the risks and benefits. Even carriers of the same mutation or from the same family may have substantially different risks for the kind and severity of cancer they are likely to get, as well as the age at which they may get them. Different people also have different values. They may choose to focus on total cancer prevention, psychological benefits, current quality of life, or overall survival. The possible impact of future medical developments in treatment or prognosis may also be of some importance for very young women and family planning.  The decision is individualized and is usually based on many factors, such as earliest occurrence of BRCA-related cancer in close relatives. 

An increasing number women who test positive for faulty BRCA1 or BRCA2 genes choose to have risk-reducing surgery. At the same time the average waiting time for undergoing the procedure is two-years which is much longer than recommended.

The protective effect of prophylactic surgery is greater when done at young age; however, oophorectomy also has adverse effects that are greatest when done long before natural menopause.  For this reason, oophorectomy is mostly recommended after age 35 or 40, assuming childbearing is complete.  The risk of ovarian cancer is low before this age, and the negative effects of oophorectomy are less serious as the woman nears natural menopause.
 For carriers of high-risk BRCA1 mutations, prophylactic oophorectomy around age 40 reduces the risk of ovarian and breast cancer and provides a substantial long-term survival advantage.  Having this surgery at a very young age provides little or no additional survival advantage, but it does increase the adverse effects from the surgery.  Compared to no intervention, having this surgery around age 40 increases the woman's chance of reaching age 70 by fifteen percentage points, from 59% to 74%. Adding prophylactic mastectomy increases the expected survival by several more percentage points.
 For carriers of high-risk BRCA2 mutations, oophorectomy around age 40 has a smaller effect.  The surgery increases the woman's chance of reaching age 70 by only five percentage points, from 75% to 80%.  When only preventive mastectomy is done at age 40 instead, the improvement is similar, with the expected chance rising from 75% to 79%. Doing both surgeries together around age 40 is expected to improve the woman's chance of reaching age 70 from 75% to 82%

For comparison, women in the general population have an 84% chance of living to age 70.

Research has looked into the effects of risk-reducing surgery on the psychological and social wellbeing of women with a BRCA mutation. Due to limited evidence, a 2019 meta analysis was unable to draw conclusions on whether interventions can help with the psychological effects of surgery in female BRCA carriers. More research is needed to conclude how best to support women who choose surgery.

Mastectomy

In a woman who has not developed breast cancer, removing the breasts may reduce her risk of ever being diagnosed with breast cancer by 90%, to a level that is approximately half the average woman's risk.

Bilateral mastectomy is the removal of both breasts by a breast surgeon. The modified radical mastectomy is only used in women diagnosed with invasive breast cancer.  Techniques for prophylactic mastectomies include:

 Simple mastectomy, which is recommended for women not having breast reconstruction, leaves the least amount of breast tissue in the body and therefore achieves the greatest risk reduction.  In addition to prophylactic use, it is also used by women who have been diagnosed with earlier stages of cancer.
 Skin-sparing mastectomy removes the tissue of the breast, nipple, and areola, but leave the "excess" skin in place for reconstruction.  It has less visible scar tissue than a simple mastectomy.
 Nipple-sparing mastectomy removes the breast tissue, but leaves the nipple and the areola intact for a more natural appearance.
 Subcutaneous mastectomy removes the breast tissue, but leaves the nipple and areola intact.  The scars are hidden in the inframammary fold under the breast.
 Areola-sparing mastectomy removes the breast tissue and the nipple, but not the areola.
 Nerve-sparing mastectomy is an effort to maintain the nerves that provide sensation to the skin over the breasts.  Breasts that have undergone any of these surgeries have much less tactile sensation than natural breasts.  Nerve-sparing techniques are an effort to retain some feeling in the breasts, with limited and often only partial success.

Which technique is used is determined by the existence of any cancer and overall health, as well as by the woman's desire, if any, for breast reconstruction surgery for aesthetic purposes.  Women who choose a flat-chested appearance or use external breast prostheses typically choose simple mastectomy, with its greater risk reduction.

Breast reconstruction is usually done by a plastic surgeon, and may be started as part of the same multi-hour surgery that removes the breasts.  Multiple techniques for reconstruction have been used, with different locations and amounts of scarring.  Some techniques use tissue from another part of the body, such as fat tissue from the lower abdomen or occasionally muscles from other parts of the torso.  Others use breast implants, possibly preceded by tissue expanders, to provide volume.  Some reconstruction techniques require multiple surgeries.  Afterwards, some women have tattoos added to simulate breast areolas or have the skin reshaped to form a nipple.

Salpingo-oophorectomy
Oophorectomy (surgical removal of the ovaries) and salpingectomy (surgical removal of the Fallopian tubes) are strongly recommended to women with BRCA mutations. Salpingo-oophorectomy is the single most effective method of preventing ovarian and Fallopian tube cancer in women with a BRCA mutation.  However, a small risk of primary peritoneal cancer remains, at least among women with BRCA1 mutations, since the peritoneal lining is the same type of cells as parts of the ovary.  This risk is estimated to produce about five cases of peritoneal cancer per 100 women with harmful BRCA1 mutations in the 20 years after the surgery.

BRCA2 related ovarian cancer tends to present in perimenopausal or menopausal women, so salpingo-oophorectomy is recommended between ages 45 and 50.

The surgery is often done in conjunction with a hysterectomy (surgical removal of the uterus) and sometimes a cervicectomy (surgical removal of the cervix), especially in women who want to take tamoxifen, which is known to cause uterine cancer, or who have uterine fibroids.  Multiple styles of surgery are available, including laparoscopic (keyhole) surgery.  Because about 5% of women with a BRCA mutation have undetected ovarian cancer at the time of their planned surgery, the surgery should be treated as if it were a removal of a known cancer.

Salpingo-oophorectomy makes the woman sterile (unable to bear children).  Infertility services can be used to preserve her eggs, if wanted.  However, as the benefits to the surgery are greatest close to menopause, most women simply postpone the surgery until they have already borne as many children as they choose to.

The surgery also artificially induces menopause, which causes hot flashes, sleep disturbances, mood swings, vaginal dryness, sexual difficulties, difficulty with word recall, and other medical signs and symptoms. The side effects range from mild to severe; most can be treated at least partially.  Many women with a BRCA take hormone replacement therapy to reduce these effects:  estrogen-progesterone combinations for women who have a uterus, and unopposed estrogen for women whose uterus was removed.  Estrogen can cause breast cancer, but as the amount of estrogen taken is less than the amount produced by the now-removed ovaries, the net risk is usually judged to be acceptable.

Some sources assume that oophorectomy before age 50 doubles the risk of cardiovascular disease and increases risk of hip fractures caused by osteoporosis in the relevant population.

Non-medical choices
Given the high risks and the low benefit of lifestyle choices in BRCA mutation carriers, no lifestyle choices provide sufficient protection.

Having her first child at a younger age, having more children than average, and breastfeeding for more than one year decreases the risk of breast cancer for an average-risk woman.  Studies about this effect among BRCA mutation carriers have produced conflicting results, but generally speaking, having children is believed to provide little or no protection against breast cancer for women with BRCA1 mutations, and to paradoxically increase the risk of breast cancer for women with BRCA2 mutations.

Being physically active and maintaining a healthy body weight prevents breast and other cancers in the general population, as well as preventing heart disease and other medical conditions.  Among women with a BRCA mutation, being physically active and having had a healthy body weight as an adolescent has no effect on ovarian cancer and delays, but does not entirely prevent, breast cancer after menopause. In some studies, only significant, strenuous exercise produced any benefit.  Obesity and weight gain as an adult are associated with breast cancer diagnoses.

Studies on specific foods, diets, or dietary supplements have generally produced conflicting information or, in the case of dietary fat, soy consumption, and drinking green tea, have only been conducted in average-risk women.  The only dietary intervention that is generally accepted as preventing breast cancer in BRCA mutation carriers is minimizing consumption of alcoholic beverages.  Consuming more than one alcoholic drink per day is strongly associated with a higher risk of developing breast cancer, and carriers are usually encouraged to consume no more than one alcoholic drink per day, and no more than four total in a week.

In a study conducted with Ashkenazi Jewish women, it was observed that mutation carriers born before 1940 have a much lower risk of being diagnosed with breast cancer by age 50 than those born after 1940; this was also observed in the non-carrier population. The reasons for the difference is unknown.  Unlike the general population, age at menarche and age at menopause has no effect on breast cancer risk for BRCA mutation carriers.

Evolutionary advantage
Several hypotheses propose that BRCA mutations might have evolutionary advantages, such as higher intelligence. The Ashkenazi intelligence hypothesis was proposed by Gregory Cochran and asserts that a defect in the BRCA1 gene might unleash neural growth.

Studies have shown that BRCA1 mutations are not random, but under adaptive selection, indicating that although BRCA1 mutations are linked to breast cancer, the mutations likely have a beneficial effect as well.

Patents

A patent application for the isolated BRCA1 gene and cancer-cancer promoting mutations discussed above, as well as methods to diagnose the likelihood of getting breast cancer, was filed by the University of Utah, National Institute of Environmental Health Sciences (NIEHS) and Myriad Genetics in 1994; over the next year, Myriad, in collaboration with investigators from Endo Recherche, Inc., HSC Research & Development Limited Partnership, and University of Pennsylvania, isolated and sequenced the BRCA2 gene and identified key mutations, and the first BRCA2 patent was filed in the US by Myriad and other institutions in 1995. Myriad is the exclusive licensee of these patents and has enforced them in the US against clinical diagnostic labs. This business model led to Myriad growing being a startup in 1994 to being a publicly traded company with 1200 employees and about $500M in annual revenue in 2012; it also led to controversy over high prices and the inability to get second opinions from other diagnostic labs, which in turn led to the landmark Association for Molecular Pathology v. Myriad Genetics lawsuit. The patents began to expire in 2014.

According to an article published in the journal, Genetic Medicine, in 2010, "The patent story outside the United States is more complicated.... For example, patents have been obtained but the patents are being ignored by provincial health systems in Canada. In Australia and the UK, Myriad's licensee permitted use by health systems, but announced a change of plans in August 2008. ... Only a single mutation has been patented in Myriad's lone European-wide patent, although some patents remain under review of an opposition proceeding. In effect, the United States is the only jurisdiction where Myriad's strong patent position has conferred sole-provider status." Peter Meldrum, CEO of Myriad Genetics, has acknowledged that Myriad has "other competitive advantages that may make such [patent] enforcement unnecessary" in Europe.

Legal decisions surrounding the BRCA1 and BRCA2 patents will affect the field of genetic testing in general. In June 2013, in  Association for Molecular Pathology v. Myriad Genetics (No. 12-398), the US Supreme Court unanimously ruled that, "A naturally occurring DNA segment is a product of nature and not patent eligible merely because it has been isolated," invalidating Myriad's patents on the BRCA1 and BRCA2 genes. However, the Court also held that manipulation of a gene to create something not found in nature could still be eligible for patent protection.

See also
 Medical genetics of Jewish people

References

External links
 BOADICEA, a risk estimator tool for familial breast and ovarian cancer
 BRCA1 and BRCA2 at Lab Tests Online
 BRCA Exchange, large database of BRCA1 and BRCA2 variants with pathogenicity classifications.

Mutation
Breast cancer
Hereditary cancers
Ovarian cancer